The Dirk Brouwer Award was established by the American Astronautical Society to honor significant technical contributions to space flight mechanics and astrodynamics and to recognize Dirk Brouwer's outstanding role in celestial mechanics and his widespread influence on workers in space flight and astrodynamics.

Recipients
Source: American Astronautical Society

See also 

 List of space technology awards
 Prizes named after people

References

External links
 American Astronautical Society - Dirk Brouwer Award

Awards established in 1972
Awards of the American Astronautical Society